Asthenoptycha iriodes is a species of moth of the  family Tortricidae. It is found in Australia.

Tortricinae
Moths of Australia
Moths described in 1898